The Newton fractal is a boundary set in the complex plane which is characterized by Newton's method applied to a fixed polynomial  or transcendental function. It is the Julia set of the meromorphic function  which is given by Newton's method. When there are no attractive cycles (of order greater than 1), it divides the complex plane into regions , each of which is associated with a root  of the polynomial, .  In this way the Newton fractal is similar to the Mandelbrot set, and like other fractals it exhibits an intricate appearance arising from a simple description.  It is relevant to numerical analysis because it shows that (outside the region of quadratic convergence) the Newton method can be very sensitive to its choice of start point.

Almost all points of the complex plane are associated with one of the  roots of a given polynomial in the following way: the point is used as starting value  for Newton's iteration {{math|zn + 1 : zn − {{sfrac|p(zn)|p'''(zn)}}}}, yielding a sequence of points  If the sequence converges to the root , then  was an element of the region . However, for every polynomial of degree at least 2 there are points for which the Newton iteration does not converge to any root: examples are the boundaries of the basins of attraction of the various roots.

An open set for which the iterations converge towards a given root or cycle (that is not a fixed point), is a Fatou set for the iteration. The complementary set to the union of all these, is the Julia set. The Fatou sets have common boundary, namely the Julia set. Therefore, each point of the Julia set is a point of accumulation for each of the Fatou sets. It is this property that causes the fractal structure of the Julia set (when the degree of the polynomial is larger than 2).

To plot images of the fractal, one may first choose a specified number  of complex points  and compute the coefficients  of the polynomial
.
Then for a rectangular lattice

Additionally or alternatively the colors may be dependent on the distance , which is defined to be the first value  such that  for some previously fixed small .

 Generalization of Newton fractals 

A generalization of Newton's iteration is

 

where  is any complex number. The special choice  corresponds to the Newton fractal.  
The fixed points of this map are stable when  lies inside the disk of radius 1 centered at 1. When  is outside this disk, the fixed points are locally unstable, however the map still exhibits a fractal structure in the sense of Julia set.

More generally, Newton's fractal is a special case of a Julia set.

Serie :  
Other fractals where potential and trigonometric functions are multiplied. 

 Nova fractal 

The Nova fractal invented in the mid 1990s by Paul Derbyshire, is a generalization of the Newton fractal with the addition of a value  at each step:

 

The "Julia" variant of the Nova fractal keeps  constant over the image and initializes  to the pixel coordinates.  The "Mandelbrot" variant of the Nova fractal initializes  to the pixel coordinates and sets  to a critical point, where

 Implementation 
In order to implement the Newton fractal, it is necessary to have a starting function as well as its derivative function:

 

The three roots of the function are

 

The above-defined functions can be translated in pseudocode as follows:
//z^3-1 
float2 Function (float2 z)
{
	return cpow(z, 3) - float2(1, 0); //cpow is an exponential function for complex numbers
}

//3*z^2
float2 Derivative (float2 z)
{
	return 3 * cmul(z, z); //cmul is a function that handles multiplication of complex numbers
}
It is now just a matter of implementing the Newton method using the given functions.
float2 roots[3] = //Roots (solutions) of the polynomial
{
	float2(1, 0), 
	float2(-.5, sqrt(3)/2), 
	float2(-.5, -sqrt(3)/2)
};
	
color colors[3] =  //Assign a color for each root
{
    red,
    green,
    blue
}

For each pixel (x, y) on the target, do:
{
	zx = scaled x coordinate of pixel (scaled to lie in the Mandelbrot X scale (-2.5, 1))
    zy = scaled y coordinate of pixel (scaled to lie in the Mandelbrot Y scale (-2, 1))

    float2 z = float2(zx, zy); //z is originally set to the pixel coordinates

	for (int iteration = 0;
	     iteration < maxIteration;
	     iteration++;)
	{
		z -= cdiv(Function(z), Derivative(z)); //cdiv is a function for dividing complex numbers

        float tolerance = 0.000001;
        
		for (int i = 0; i < roots.Length; i++)
		{
		    float2 difference = z - roots[i];
		    
			//If the current iteration is close enough to a root, color the pixel.
			if (abs(difference.x) < tolerance && abs (difference.y) < tolerance)
			{
				return colors[i]; //Return the color corresponding to the root
			}
		}
		
    }
    
    return black; //If no solution is found
}

 See also 
 Julia set
 Mandelbrot set

References

Further reading
  J. H. Hubbard, D. Schleicher, S. Sutherland: How to Find All Roots of Complex Polynomials by Newton's Method'', Inventiones Mathematicae vol. 146 (2001) – with a discussion of the global structure of Newton fractals
On the Number of Iterations for Newton's Method by Dierk Schleicher July 21, 2000
Newton's Method as a Dynamical System by Johannes Rueckert
Newton's Fractal (which Newton knew nothing about) by 3Blue1Brown, along with an interactive demonstration of the fractal on his website, and the source code for the demonstration

Numerical analysis
Fractals